Neptune trojans are bodies that orbit the Sun near one of the stable Lagrangian points of Neptune, similar to the trojans of other planets. They therefore have approximately the same orbital period as Neptune and follow roughly the same orbital path. Twenty-eight Neptune trojans are currently known, of which 24 orbit near the Sun–Neptune  Lagrangian point 60° ahead of Neptune and four orbit near Neptune's  region 60° behind Neptune. The Neptune trojans are termed 'trojans' by analogy with the Jupiter trojans.

It is suspected that large (radius ≈ 100 km) Neptune trojans could outnumber Jupiter trojans by an order of magnitude.

In 2010, the discovery of the first known  Neptune trojan, was announced. Neptune's trailing  region is currently very difficult to observe because it is along the line of sight to the center of the Milky Way, an area of the sky crowded with stars.

Discovery and exploration 
In 2001, the first Neptune trojan was discovered, near Neptune's  region, and with it the fifth known populated stable reservoir of small bodies in the Solar System. In 2005, the discovery of the high-inclination trojan  has indicated that the Neptune trojans populate thick clouds, which has constrained their possible origins (see below).

On August 12, 2010, the first  trojan, was announced. It was discovered by a dedicated survey that scanned regions where the light from the stars near the Galactic Center is obscured by dust clouds. This suggests that large  trojans are as common as large  trojans, to within uncertainty, further constraining models about their origins (see below).

It would have been possible for the New Horizons spacecraft to investigate  Neptune trojans discovered by 2014, when it passed through this region of space en route to Pluto. Some of the patches where the light from the Galactic Center is obscured by dust clouds are along New Horizons'''s flight path, allowing detection of objects that the spacecraft could image. , the highest-inclination Neptune trojan known, was just bright enough for New Horizons to observe it in end-2013 at a distance of 1.2 AU. However, New Horizons'' may not have had sufficient downlink bandwidth, so it was eventually decided to give precedence to the preparations for the Pluto flyby.

Dynamics and origin 

The orbits of Neptune trojans are highly stable; Neptune may have retained up to 50% of the original post-migration trojan population over the age of the Solar System. Neptune's  can host stable trojans equally well as its . Neptune trojans can librate up to 30° from their associated Lagrangian points with a 10,000-year period. Neptune trojans that escape enter orbits similar to centaurs. Although Neptune cannot currently capture stable trojans, roughly 2.8% of the centaurs within 34 AU are predicted to be Neptune co-orbitals.

The unexpected high-inclination trojans are the key to understanding the origin and evolution of the population as a whole. The existence of high-inclination Neptune trojans points to a capture during planetary migration instead of in situ or collisional formation. The estimated equal number of large  and  trojans indicates that there was no gas drag during capture and points to a common capture mechanism for both  and  trojans. The capture of Neptune trojans during a migration of the planets occurs via process similar to the chaotic capture of Jupiter trojans in the Nice model. When Uranus and Neptune are near but not in a mean-motion resonance the locations where Uranus passes Neptune can circulate with a period that is in resonance with the libration periods of Neptune trojans. This results in repeated perturbations that increase the libration of existing trojans causing their orbits to become unstable. This process is reversible allowing new trojans to be captured when the planetary migration continues. For high-inclination trojans to be captured the migration must have been slow, or their inclinations must have been acquired previously.

Colors 
The first four discovered Neptune trojans have similar colors. They are modestly red, slightly redder than the gray Kuiper belt objects, but not as extremely red as the high-perihelion cold classical Kuiper belt objects. This is similar to the colors of the blue lobe of the centaur color distribution, the Jupiter trojans, the irregular satellites of the gas giants, and possibly the comets, which is consistent with a similar origin of these populations of small Solar System bodies.

The Neptune trojans are too faint to efficiently observe spectroscopically with current technology, which means that a large variety of surface compositions are compatible with the observed colors.

Several Neptunian Trojans have been observed to have very-red colors similar to cold classical Kuiper belt objects.

Naming 

In 2015, the IAU adopted a new naming scheme for Neptune trojans, which are to be named after Amazons, with no differentiation between objects in L4 and L5. The Amazons were an all-female warrior tribe that fought in the Trojan War on the side of the Trojans against the Greeks. As of 2019, the named Neptune trojans are 385571 Otrera (after Otrera, the first Amazonian queen in Greek mythology) and 385695 Clete (after Clete, an Amazon and the attendant to the Amazons' queen Penthesilea, who led the Amazons in the Trojan war).

Members 

The amount of high-inclination objects in such a small sample, in which relatively fewer high-inclination Neptune trojans are known due to observational biases, implies that high-inclination trojans may significantly outnumber low-inclination trojans. The ratio of high- to low-inclination Neptune trojans is estimated to be about 4:1. Assuming albedos of 0.05, there are an expected  Neptune trojans with radii above 40 km in Neptune's . This would indicate that large Neptune trojans are 5 to 20 times more abundant than Jupiter trojans, depending on their albedos. There may be relatively fewer smaller Neptune trojans, which could be because these fragment more readily. Large  trojans are estimated to be as common as large  trojans.

 and  display significant dynamical instability. This means they could have been captured after planetary migration, but may as well be a long-term member that happens not to be perfectly dynamically stable.

As of April 2022, 33 Neptune trojans are known, of which 28 orbit near the Sun–Neptune  Lagrangian point 60° ahead of Neptune, 4 orbit near Neptune's  region 60° behind Neptune, and one orbits on the opposite side of Neptune but frequently changes location relative to Neptune to L4 and L5. These are listed in the following table.

See also 
Nice model
Nice 2 model
, a temporary quasi-satellite of Neptune.

Notes

References

External links 
 
 

Distant minor planets
 
Lists of minor planets
8